San Salvatore is a 1956 West German drama film directed by Werner Jacobs and starring Dieter Borsche, Antje Weisgerber and Will Quadflieg.

It was shot at the Bavaria Studios in Munich and the Wandsbek Studios in Hamburg. Location filming took place in the St. Pauli district and Lugano in Switzerland. The film's sets were designed by the art directors Franz Bi and Bruno Monden.

Cast
Will Quadflieg as Doctor Manfred Carell
Dieter Borsche as Doctor Robert Kant
Antje Weisgerber as Dagmar Gerken
Carl Wery as Schriftsteller Althoff
Marianne Wischmann as Doctor Katharina Hallberg
Charles Regnier as Doctor Monthé
Hanna Rucker as Trude Monthé
Rudolf Fernau as Doctor Stormer
Friedrich Domin as Doctor Breymann
Hans Leibelt as Professor Weber
Arnulf Schröder as Studienrat Heider
Herbert Hübner as Professor Brink
Michl Lang as Gärtner Xaver

References

External links

1956 drama films
German drama films
West German films
Films directed by Werner Jacobs
Medical-themed films
Films shot at Bavaria Studios
Films shot at Wandsbek Studios
1950s German films
German black-and-white films